Markus Henriksen (born 25 July 1992) is a Norwegian professional footballer who plays as a midfielder for Eliteserien club Rosenborg.

Club career

Rosenborg
Henriksen moved from Trond IL to Rosenborg as a boy. He proved himself early on as an exciting midfielder, showing traits of footballing intelligence, basic skill and excellent endurance.

2009
Henriksen made his Rosenborg debut in a cup game against Gjøvik-Lyn on 10 May 2009, coming on for Alexander Tettey in the 86th minute. His Tippeligaen debut came later that year when he was a late substitute for Trond Olsen against Sandefjord on 20 September 2009. Despite aggregating little over half an hour of football that season, he played the three games necessary to gain a 2009 Tippeligaen medal at the age of just 17 years.

2010
In 2010, Henriksen became a regular fixture in the Rosenborg side under Erik Hamrén and continued to do so when Nils Arne Eggen replaced the outgoing Hamrén. He played in 28 of a possible 30 games, 26 appearances as a first team starter.

He scored his first professional goals against Odd Grenland on 11 April 2010 where his brace inspired Rosenborg to a 3–1 comeback. On 21 July 2010, Henriksen's first goal in Europe culminated Linfield to a 2–0 loss in the Champions League second qualifying round.

Scouts from Werder Bremen attended the match to watch Henriksen, but Rosenborg's sporting director, Erik Hoftun rebutted any links by stating that Henriksen will continue his development at Rosenborg. Henriksen put an end to any speculation on 6 August 2010 when he extended his contract till the end of 2013. His agent, Andreas Ekker admitted that "Markus could have gone to a bigger club by now, but we think it's best for Markus to stay at RBK."

He went on to score two more goals in Champions League qualifying that year and scored once more against Atlético Madrid in the Europa League group stages on 4 November 2010.

His excellent season, in which he helped Rosenborg to an unbeaten league title, was rewarded with numerous awards including NISO Young Male Player of the Year and Statoil's Talent Prize 2010. Don Balón named Henriksen on their list of the 100 best young players in the world in 2010, where he joined the likes of compatriot Harmeet Singh, Mario Götze, Eden Hazard, Neymar and Theo Walcott.

2011
With the sale of Anthony Annan to Schalke before the start of the 2011 season, Henriksen was asked to play a more defensive role beside the similarly attack-minded Per Ciljan Skjelbred. After three games, in which Rosenborg conceded ten goals, Jan Jönsson aborted plans on making Henriksen a defensive midfielder and brought in Fredrik Winsnes to play alongside him. Henriksen returning to his favoured box-to-box role instantly saw Rosenborg win 2–0 in back-to-back games. However, it was only until Rosenborg finally replaced Annan with Mohammed-Awal Issah in August that Henriksen could make the attacking effect he had shown possible the season prior; in Issah's first six games for Rosenborg, Henriksen scored five goals and assisted a further two. On Issah's arrival, Henriksen told TV 2 Sport, "I'm beginning to become more offensive and I've brought more to each game since Issah has arrived."

On 21 September of that year, the Daily Mirror reported that Aston Villa were interested in Henriksen whilst Napoli had also been known to have scouted him. Henriksen furthered speculation linking him abroad in a November interview with Aftenposten, "I want to try and show that I am good enough to play elsewhere than in Norway. I think I'd best fit Germany, so it is my dream to play in a good team in the Bundesliga."

2012
Late on 27 January 2012, Henriksen left Rosenborg's training camp in Benidorm for Belgium to complete a €2 million move to Club Brugge. Rosenborg cited economic reasons as to why the offer was accepted. The next day, however, Henriksen confirmed on his personal Twitter account that he had turned down a move to Club Brugge by stating, "Congratulations boys for the win. Looking forward to Benidorm. Turned down Brugge because of my gut feeling and the total package."

For Henriksen this would be his last season at the club. In March 2012 he played in the league opener against SK Brann and made a further 17 out of 19 appearances, scoring one goal, until he was sold to Dutch club AZ Alkmaar in the region of €2 million.

AZ Alkmaar

2012–13
On 31 August 2012, Henriksen left Rosenborg for a fee of around €2 million to AZ Alkmaar and signed a five-year contract with the club. He made his debut for AZ on 16 September 2012 when he replaced Maarten Martens after 72 minutes in the 4–0 victory against Roda JC. Henriksen was a first team regular in his debut season in the Eredivisie scoring three and assisting three goals. In the Dutch Cup Henriksen played every minute en route to the final where he provided a crucial assist to Adam Maher to open the scoring in the final, AZ would score just 2 minutes later at De Kuip and win the final and the Cup 2–1 against PSV Eindhoven.
Henriksen was named as AZ player of the year this season beating top scorer Jozy Altidore and young sensation Adam Maher.

2013–14
After a great season previously Henriksen started the season as a first team regular but first team places were limited partly due to the arrival of manager Dick Advocaat after Gertjan Verbeek departed and the emergence and form of Celso Ortiz. Henriksen only scored twice and featured half as much as the previous season.

Hull City

2016–17
On 31 August 2016, he signed for Hull City on loan until January 2017, with a deal which was made permanent. On his Hull debut he assisted the first goal and scored a late winner in a 2–1 EFL Cup win over Stoke City on 21 September 2016. On 6 January 2017, his loan from AZ became permanent when he signed a -year deal. On 30 September 2017, he scored his first goal, after becoming a member of Hull City, when he came off the bench to get the 5th goal in a 6–1 home victory over Birmingham City.

2018–19
On 1 August 2018, Henriksen was named captain for the season.

On 1 March 2019, Henriksen had his contract with the club extended by one year.

On 30 June 2020, Hull indicated that Henriksen would leave the club following the expiry of his contract.

Bristol City (loan) 
On 31 January 2020, Henriksen joined Bristol City on loan until the end of the season. He was allowed to leave on 21 June 2020 to pursue "other options".

Rosenborg 
On 27 September 2020, Henriksen re-joined Rosenborg after eight years.

International career

Henriksen made his Norway under-21 debut against Croatia under-21 on 11 August 2010. He scored Norway's only goal in a 4–1 loss. He has been ever present in Norway's 2013 European Under-21 Championship qualification campaign, scoring once against Azerbaijan under-21 and assisting once against England under-21.

Just over two months after making his Norway under-21 debut, he made his senior debut for the Norwegian national side against the same country; on 12 October 2010, at the age of just 18 years, Henriksen played the first half in an away friendly against Croatia which Norway went on to lose 2–1. His first competitive game came on 4 June 2011 when he was an 83rd minute substitution for Christian Grindheim against Portugal.

On 23 November 2011, Henriksen was called up to play in the 2012 King's Cup in Thailand to run from 15 to 21 January. After an impressive performance against Denmark League XI, Henriksen explained his intentions for the national team, "I'm going to be a leader, both here [with the national side] and at Rosenborg, regardless of age. I am the type of player who likes to take responsibility, both with my football and voice." The national coach Egil Olsen concurred, "It would surprise me if he does not play in the national team over time...I see him in a leadership role, perhaps such is quite possible by the autumn."

Henriksen scored his first goal for the national team in the 2014 World Cup qualifying match against Slovenia. After starting five of the first six matches in the qualifying campaign for the 2014 World Cup, Henriksen was left out of the squad for the matches against Cyprus and Switzerland in September 2013, and instead called up for the under-21 team. Egil "Drillo" Olsen stated that Henriksen's performance in the recent matches was not good enough, and that it would be better for him to play for the under-21 team then to sit on the bench for the senior team.

Personal life 
He is the son of the former Rosenborg player and manager, Trond Henriksen.

In November 2020, he tested positive for COVID-19.

Career statistics

Club

International

Scores and results list Norway's goal tally first, score column indicates score after each Henriksen goal.

Honours
Rosenborg
Tippeligaen: 2009, 2010
Norwegian under-19 Championship: 2009
Superfinalen: 2010

AZ
KNVB Cup: 2012–13

Norway U21
UEFA European Under-21 Championship bronze: 2013

Individual
Statoil's Talentpris: June 2010
Statoil's Talentpris of the Year: 2010
NISO Young Male Player of the Year: 2010

References

External links

 Voetbal International profile 
 Norway profile at Fotball.No
 

1992 births
Living people
Footballers from Trondheim
Association football midfielders
Norwegian footballers
Norway international footballers
Norway youth international footballers
Norway under-21 international footballers
Eliteserien players
Eredivisie players
Premier League players
Rosenborg BK players
AZ Alkmaar players
Hull City A.F.C. players
Bristol City F.C. players
Norwegian expatriate footballers
Norwegian expatriate sportspeople in England
Expatriate footballers in the Netherlands
Expatriate footballers in England
Norwegian expatriate sportspeople in the Netherlands
English Football League players